Sarmayeh Bank Volleyball Club (Bâshgâh-e Vâlibâl-e Bânk-e Sarmâye) was an Iranian professional volleyball team based in Tehran, Iran.

History
In 2015 Sarmayeh Bank Volleyball Club was established in Tehran, Iran. Sarmayeh started its appearance in Iranian Volleyball Super League by hiring famous players from Iranian national team.
They achieved the champion title in the first year of presence in Iranian Premiere League.

Invincible Sarmayeh Bank underlined their supremacy over the 2016 Asian Men’s Club Championship in Myanmar following their 3-1 victory over Qatar’s Al-Arabi in the final showdown and sweeping Toyoda Gosei Trefuerza 3-0 in the 2017 Asian Men’s Club Championship final in Vietnam.

The team was dissolved in March 2018 after the third consecutive championship in the Iranian Volleyball Super League.

Men's team

Women's team

Honors
Iranian Super League
 Winners (3): 2016, 2017, 2018

Asian Club Championship
 Winners (2): 2016, 2017

Club World Championship
 Seventh place (1): 2017

References

Iranian volleyball clubs
Sport in Tehran Province
Volleyball clubs established in 2015
2015 establishments in Iran